was an old province of Japan in northern Kyūshū in the area of Fukuoka Prefecture and Ōita Prefecture. It was sometimes called , with Bungo Province. Buzen bordered on Bungo and Chikuzen Provinces.

History
The ruins of the ancient capital of the province were found near Toyotsu, Fukuoka. The castle town of Kokura was also in Buzen, and a seat of many feudal rulers.

During the Meiji period, the provinces of Japan were converted into prefectures.  Maps of Japan and Buzen Province were reformed in the 1870s.

After the abolition of the clan system in 1871 Buzen Province became Kokura Prefecture for four years until it was absorbed by Fukuoka Prefecture in 1876.  At the same time, the province continued to exist for some purposes.  For example, Buzen is explicitly recognized in the 1894 treaties with the United States and the United Kingdom.

Shrines and temples
Usa jinjū was the chief Shinto shrine (ichinomiya) of Buzen.

Historical districts
 Fukuoka Prefecture
 Kiku District (企救郡)
 Kōge District (上毛郡) - merged with Tsuiki District to become Chikujō District (築上郡) on February 26, 1896
 Miyako District (京都郡) - absorbed Nakatsu District on February 26, 1896
 Nakatsu District (仲津郡) - merged into Miyako District on February 26, 1896
 Tagawa District (田川郡)
 Tsuiki District (築城郡) - merged with Kōge District to become Chikujō District on February 26, 1896
 Ōita Prefecture
 Shimoge District (下毛郡) - dissolved
 Usa District (宇佐郡) - dissolved

See also
Kokura Prefecture
Buzen, Fukuoka (City)
 Kokura Domain 
 Nakatsu Domain

Notes

References
 Nussbaum, Louis-Frédéric and Käthe Roth. (2005).  Japan encyclopedia. Cambridge: Harvard University Press. ;  OCLC 58053128
 Papinot, Edmond. (1910). Historical and Geographic Dictionary of Japan. Tokyo: Librarie Sansaisha. OCLC 77691250

External links 

  Murdoch's map of provinces, 1903

Former provinces of Japan